Electric Entertainment, Inc. is an American television and media production company, established in 2001 by veteran writer/producer Dean Devlin and led by Devlin along with partners Marc Roskin and Rachel Olschan.

History 
Electric Entertainment was established when many workers of Centropolis Entertainment, including Dean Devlin left to form its organization in 2001. This included its development slate, that were originally controlled by Centropolis, including the film Eight Legged Freaks, which is the first film to be produced by the company.

Later that year, the studio struck a deal with Paramount Pictures in order to gain Electric access to Paramount's development slate.

Five years later, the studio struck a deal with Metro-Goldwyn-Mayer to distribute its content for feature films.

In 2019, the studio launched its own streaming service, Electric Now, to provide its content for the OTT streaming range and it will run for all digital platforms.

Electric Visual Effects (EFX)
EFX is the in-house division of Electric Entertainment and headed by Mark Franco. The company consists of film industry veterans who had previously collaborated on projects produced by Dean Devlin.

Filmography

Films

Television

References

External links
 

Film production companies of the United States
Television production companies of the United States
Entertainment companies based in California
Mass media companies established in 2001
Companies based in Beverly Hills, California
American companies established in 2001
2001 establishments in California
American independent film studios